This is a list of bands that play goregrind, a fusion of grindcore music with death metal.

List of notable bands

See also 

 List of deathgrind bands

References 

Lists of grindcore bands
Goregrind